Prospect Hill Cemetery may refer to:

Prospect Hill Cemetery (Millis, Massachusetts), listed on the NRHP in Massachusetts
Prospect Hill Cemetery (Omaha, Nebraska), a pioneer cemetery in Omaha, Nebraska
Prospect Hill Cemetery, location of Prospect Hill Cemetery Building, Guilderland, New York, listed on the National Register of Historic Places in Albany County, New York
Prospect Hill Cemetery (York, Pennsylvania)
Prospect Hill Cemetery (Brattleboro, Vermont) in Windham County, Vermont
Prospect Hill Cemetery (Washington, D.C.), a historic German-American cemetery